The men's coxless four competition at the 2002 Asian Games in Busan was held on 2 October 2002 at the Nakdong River.

Schedule
All times are Korea Standard Time (UTC+09:00)

Results

References 

2002 Asian Games Official Reports, Page 525
Results

External links 
Official Website

Rowing at the 2002 Asian Games